Ricardo Almendáriz was a Guatemalan draftsman who accompanied Antonio del Río to the first excavation of pre-Columbian Maya ruins at Palenque in Chiapas, Mexico.  Undertaken in May and June 1787, the expedition was performed under orders from Charles III of Spain, to investigate reports about the ruins from the inhabitants of the neighboring pueblo of Santo Domingo de Palenque.  The team spent two weeks digging at the location, followed by three weeks studying the site.

Almendáriz made thirty drawings of the bas relief sculptures at the Palenque ruins.  These drawings were intended to accompany del Río's written report, which was dated June 24, 1787.  According to George Stuart, writing for the Kislak Foundation, the del Río report "ranks as the first substantial archaeological report known in the Americas." Almendáriz's drawings of Palenque are "remarkably accurate for the era" and depict features of Palenque that have since been destroyed from exposure. For this reason they remain scientifically useful.

The Almendáriz drawings were copied for archival purposes. The most complete set of contemporary copies belongs to the library of the Royal Palace in Madrid.

Notes

References

External links

Coleccion de Estampas Copiadas de las Figuras Originales From the Collections at the Library of Congress

18th-century births
Year of death unknown
Guatemalan artists
18th-century Mesoamericanists
Mesoamerican artists
Mayanists
Guatemalan Mesoamericanists
Latin American artists of indigenous descent
People of New Spain